Boris Borisovich Grebenshchikov (born ) is a prominent member of the generation which is widely considered to be the "founding fathers" of Russian rock music. He is the founder and lead singer of the band Aquarium which has been active since 1972. Grebenshchikov is frequently referred to as BG (pronounced "Beh-Geh"), after his initials.

Early years (1953–1979)
Grebenshchikov was born on 27 November 1953, in Leningrad, now St. Petersburg. In 1972, he founded the band Aquarium with his childhood friend Anatoly "George" Gonitsky as a postmodern theatrical endeavor that included poetry and music.

Grebenshchikov was accepted into Leningrad State University. Due to his musical activities, he started missing exams and failing classes. Grebenshchikov eventually received a graduate degree in applied mathematics. Inspiration from The Beatles and Bob Dylan transformed Aquarium into a low-fi electric blues band that moonlighted in acoustic reggae.

The Communist Party of the Soviet Union regime routinely suppressed experiments in non-standardized self-expression as a matter of policy, so decent recording facilities were out of reach. The several two-track recordings hacked out over those years, such as Temptation of St. Aquarium (Iskushenie Svyatogo Akvariuma), Count Diffusor's Fables (Pritchi grafa Diffuzora), Menuet for a Farmer (Menuet zemledel'tzu), and a motley crew of "singles" were of unprofessional quality but showcased showed his interest in Oriental thought and mysticism that eventually became his trademarks.

In 1976, Grebenshchikov also recorded of his first solo album S toy storony zerkal'nogo stekla (Beyond the Mirror Glass) and a double album with Mike Naomenko titled All Brothers are sisters (Vse Brat'ya - sestry).

Classical years (1980–1988)
In 1980, Artemy Troitsky, the first public Russian rock critic, invited Aquarium to perform at the Tbilisi Rock Festival.

The festival was a state-sanctioned attempt to control the Russian rock music movement. A covert KGB-bound report caused Grebenshchikov to lose his day job and membership in Komsomol.

As western rock music was still officially banned at the time, Aquarium acquired more underground listeners. 

The first Aquarium music available in the West was in 1986 when a double album entitled RED WAVE, 4 UNDERGROUND BANDS FROM THE USSR appeared in record stores in the U.S. Besides Aquarium, Kino, Strange Games, and Alisa were recorded on a four-track machine, smuggled out of the country, and released by a small record label from Hollywood. During this time, bands in the USSR were either officially sanctioned or were not allowed to play in public or record in professional recording studios.

By the time Aquarium disbanded amid internal discord in 1991, they had 11 official records under their belt.

Going West (1988–1990)
Perestroika had ushered in a new era of opportunity for rock musicians. In 1989, Grebenshchikov released Radio Silence, produced by Dave Stewart of Eurythmics fame. Radio Silence featured covers of Alexander Vertinsky's "China" amid songs by Grebenshchikov, including a song written to Sir Thomas Malory's Death of King Arthur. Annie Lennox, Billy MacKenzie, and Chrissie Hynde helped out, as did several of Grebenshchikov's bandmates from Aquarium. The single "Radio Silence" was his biggest hit outside of Russia, reaching number 7 on the Billboard Hot Modern Rock Chart in the United States in August 1989.

He issued another English-language album, Radio London, in 1996, which consisted of demos made in 1990 and 1991.

Returning East (1991–1996)
Grebenshchikov returned to Russia and came out with a Russian album (Russkiy al'bom), backed by the eponymous BG Band, in 1992.

The Aquarium album Favorite songs of Ramses the 4th (Lyubimye pesni Ramzesa IV) was mostly filler, and Archive vol 4 was all outtakes. The band's next three albums are effectively Grebenshchikov's solo albums published under the band's brand. Navigator, Snow lion (Snezhniy lev), and Hyperborea have a stylized Russian feel.

Back to basics (1997–2019)
His 1997 album Lilith is still mostly Russian in lyrical theme but is recorded by way of a chance meeting with his idol Dylan's former backing group, The Band.

His 1999 album Psi features an interpretation through a post-modernistic lens with use of keyboard samplers. His 2002 album Sister Chaos (Sestra Haos), 2003 album Fisherman's songs (Pesni rybaka), and 2005 album ZOOM ZOOM ZOOM had Armenian, Indian, and African influences respectively, particularly from Jivan Gasparyan.

In 2014 he released Salt, "one of the best albums of Grebenshchikov’s long career, an astonishing, visceral piece of work that more than lives up to its moniker: earthy, vital, biting, life-enhancing".

Radio "Aerostat"
Since 2005, Grebenshchikov has had a weekly radio program on Russian radio station Radio Rossii titled Aerostat (Russian: Аэростат). It is presented as "author's program of Boris Grebenshchikov" and he is the creator and speaker. Aerostrat is about alternatives in music and the music not played on today's radio despite its artistic value and originality. Grebenshchikov states that it is mostly independent music which would "otherwise would not be played at all." Songs played on Aerostat vary from 1960s and 1970s rock (e.g., The Beatles, Bob Dylan) to reggae, new wave, alternative rock, electronica, punk, world music, jazz, classical, and avant-garde. As of April 2019, more than 700 shows have been created and broadcast, each approximately 46 minutes long. The track lists and the scripts of all programs are available at official site of Aquarium and Grebenshchikov.

Religion and mysticism
Grebenshchikov is known as a student of religion and mysticism. He has translated several Hindu and Buddhist scriptures into Russian, travelled the Orient widely, and made friends with various spiritual celebrities.

Grebenshchikov's published translations of Buddhist and Hindu texts:

 Chökyi Nyima Rinpoche (son of Tulku Urgyen Rinpoche) Bardo Guidebook – "source material for the Tibetan Book of Living & Dying also known as Tibetan Book of the Dead Bardo Thodol", in 1995.
 Tulku Urgyen Rinpoche Repeating Words of the Buddha – "the essential points of spiritual practice, inseparable from everyday life", in 1997.
 Tulku Urgyen Rinpoche Rainbow Painting – "addressing the topics of practices of accumulating and purifying to facilitate unification of view and conduct", in 1999.
 Shibendu Lahiri Kriya yoga – "authentic teachings and techniques of Kriya Yoga", in 2003.
 The Katha Upanishad, Upanishad belonging to the Yajur Veda, in 2005.

Opposition to the Russian invasion of Ukraine
On 5 October 2022, Grebenshchikov appeared on BBC Hardtalk talking about his opposition to the War in Ukraine, his self-imposed exile to London, and his involvement with Dave Stewart to produce an antiwar record.

Production
Grebenshchikov's lyrics are often eclectic.

Over the years of his career, Grebenshchikov has written more than 500 songs. Additionally, he  has recorded cover albums on material from Alexander Vertinsky (Songs of A.Vertinsky (Pesni A.Vertinskogo)) in 1994 and Bulat Okudzhava's (Songs of B.Okudzhava (Pesni B.Okudzhavy)) in 1999, two albums of mantra music with Gabrielle Roth and the Mirrors, (Refuge in 1998 and Bardo in 2002), and an album of electronica versions of Aquarium songs from late 1970s – early 1980s with the Russian duo Deadushki.

Albums

Russian
 Russian Album (1991)
 Songs by Alexander Vertinsky (1994)
 Chubchik (1996)
 Lilith (1997) with The Band
 Refuge (1998) with Gabrielle Roth
 Songs by Bulat Okudzhava (1999)
 Bardo (2002) with Gabrielle Roth
 Salt (2014)
 Vremya N (2018)
 The Sign of Fire (2020)

English

Singles

References

Bibliography
 Гаккель В. Аквариум как способ ухода за теннисным кортом. – М.: Сентябрь, 2000.
 Гребенщиков Б. Б. Правдивая автобиография Аквариума. (Письмо Артемию Троицкому, 1980 год.)
 Гребенщиков Б. Б. Краткий отчёт о 16-ти годах звукозаписи. – 1997.
 Рыбин А., Кушнир А., Гребенщиков Б., Соловьёв-Спасский В. Аквариум. Сны о чём-то большем... – М.: Нота-Р, 2003.
 Троицкий А. Рок в Союзе: 60-е, 70-е, 80-е… – М.: Искусство, 1991. – 203 с – .

External links

 Tomi Huttunen: Russian rock: Boris Grebenschikov, Intertextualist
 Aquarium website
 This article borrows from the "Short history of Aquarium", which seems to be public domain.
 Boris Grebenshikov Concert – Site for Grebenshikov's concerts at the Royal Albert Hall.
 Aquarium Bookshelf with Buddhist materials translated to Russian by Grebenshchikov
 The Bodhisattvas of Babylon, an English-language fan site

 

1953 births
20th-century Russian male singers
20th-century Russian singers
21st-century Russian male singers
21st-century Russian singers
Living people
 
Aquarium (band) members
Kino (band) members
Musicians from Saint Petersburg
Singers from Saint Petersburg
Saint Petersburg State University alumni
Recipients of the Order "For Merit to the Fatherland", 4th class
Russian rock singers
Soviet male singers
Russian activists against the 2022 Russian invasion of Ukraine